Gordan Vidović (born 23 June 1968 in Sarajevo, Bosnia and Herzegovina) is a former football player who played for the Belgium national team.

His first club was FK Igman from Ilidža, suburb of Sarajevo. He was spotted there in 1988, by FK Željezničar Sarajevo and soon moved to this top division club where he played 87 games and scored 16 goals. When the War in Bosnia-Herzegovina started, he went to Swiss FC St. Gallen. After that, he moved to Belgium and played for KVK Tienen and Royal Capellen FC during 60 games (56 goals) where he was the club's best goalscorer. In 1995, he signed a contract with R.E. Mouscron. He played 166 games and scored 37 goals for the club.

This former striker was reconverted to the role of central defender by coach Georges Leekens when he was at Mouscron.  Leekens also offered him to play for the Belgium national team. Vidović accepted the offer and he was capped 18 times. Gordan Vidovic was part of the 1998 World Cup squad in France where he played 3 games.

References
 
 Profile at Playerhistory 
 
 

1968 births
Living people
Footballers from Sarajevo
Naturalised citizens of Belgium
Bosnia and Herzegovina emigrants to Belgium
Bosnia and Herzegovina footballers
Yugoslav footballers
Belgian footballers
Belgium international footballers
1998 FIFA World Cup players
Association football defenders
FK Željezničar Sarajevo players
FC St. Gallen players
Bosnia and Herzegovina expatriate footballers
Expatriate footballers in Switzerland
Bosnia and Herzegovina expatriate sportspeople in Switzerland
Royal Excel Mouscron players
Yugoslav First League players
Belgian Pro League players
K.V.K. Tienen-Hageland players
Royal Cappellen F.C. players